The 2014 Visit Panamá Cup was a professional tennis tournament played on clay courts. It was the third edition of the tournament which was part of the 2014 ATP Challenger Tour. It took place in Panama City, Panama between 17 and 23 March 2014.

Singles main-draw entrants

Seeds

 1 Rankings are as of March 10, 2014.

Other entrants
The following players received wildcards into the singles main draw:
  Christian Garin
  Emilio Gómez
  Jose Gilbert Gomez
  Jesse Witten

The following players received entry from the qualifying draw:
  Jason Kubler
  Thiago Monteiro
  Antonio Veić 
  Marco Trungelliti

Champions

Singles

  Pere Riba def.  Blaž Rola, 7–5, 5–7, 6–2

Doubles

 František Čermák /  Michail Elgin def.  Martín Alund /  Guillermo Durán, 4–6, 6–3, [10–8]

External links
Official Website

Visit Panama Cup
Visit Panamá Cup
Visit Panama Cup